Brighella (in Bergamasque dialect: Brighèla) is a comic, masked character from the Italian theatre style Commedia dell'arte. Later he took to wearing a sort of livery with a matching cape. He wore a greenish half-mask (traditionally olive-green) displaying a look of preternatural lust and greed. It is distinguished by a hook nose and thick lips, along with a thick twirled mustache to give him an offensive characteristic. He evolved out of the general Zanni, as evidenced by his costume, and came into his own around the start of the 16th  century.

He is loosely categorized as one of the zanni or servant characters though he often was portrayed as a member of the middle class such as a tavern owner: his character could be adapted to whatever the needs to the scenario might be, just as Brighella himself is adaptable to any circumstance. He is essentially Arlecchino's smarter and much more vindictive older brother. They both share the same traditional birthplace: Bergamo, a city in Northern Italy. As in a stereotype of those who have risen from poverty, he is often most cruel to those beneath him on the social ladder; he even goes so far as to kill on occasion. In later versions of his character these violent and malicious traits were lessened substantially. Pierre Louis Duchartre, in his The Italian Comedy, theorizes that in France, the gentrified Brighella eventually culminated in the character of Figaro, known from the plays and operas.

Brighella is  a masterful liar, and can make up a spur-of-the moment lie for any situation. He is an inveterate schemer, and he is good at what he does. If his plans failed, it was almost always out of luck on behalf of the other characters. When he is a servant, he will either serve his master devotedly or look for every opportunity to ruin and take advantage of him as he happens to see fit—whatever will gain the greatest advantage for himself and himself alone. He is fond of money, but spends it rapidly, and tends to be especially fond of the drink. In fact, he has few good qualities save for his ability to entertain the audience.

His walk is distinguishable from the traditional Zanni movement by the torso bending from side to side while the head stays vertical. The knees stay open and the elbows bend down with each movement of the leg.

His character is usually from uptown Milano or Bergamo, and in the original Italian would often speak with the local accent. He could be very witty and fond of wordplay. He is also an accomplished singer, dancer and musician, and sometimes would play the guitar on stage.

His name comes from an Italian word which can mean "bother" or "contention" in Italian; Florio's 1611 Italian-English Dictionary defines briga as meaning "a brable, a braule, a contention". Brighella  in English would be therefore something like "Fighty" or "Brawly". The other Italian word attaccabrighe ("hellraiser") utilizes the same element.

Famous Brighellas 
17th Century:
 Domenico Boroncini

18th Century:
 Giuseppe Antonio Angeleri
 Tommaso Fortunati
 Pietro Gandini
 Carlo Campi
 Atanasio Zanoni

Variants 
A list of variations of the character, according to Duchartre, are:

Beltrame: from the 17th century, a "wilfully blind husband and rascal as crafty as Brighella." He was Milanese and spoke the local  dialect. As part of his costume he apparently wore a distinctive large tunic.   
Scapin, or Scapino: A much more nervous and cowardly version of Brighella.    
Truccagnino: See Fenocchio.
Mezzetino: A gentler version of Brighella, fond of the ladies even if they were not fond of him.   
Fenocchio: More prone to playing pranks than committing serious intrigues, he otherwise shared Brighella's fondness for malice.   
Flautino: A musical Brighella, often singing a cappella. The Comédie-Italienne actor Giovanni Gherardi, who performed this role, was able to perform the part of an entire orchestra with his voice alone.
Sbrigani: Sometimes the exact opposite of Brighella, otherwise an identical character; like twins. Frequently appeared alongside Brighella onstage.  
Franca Trippa, Francatrippa or Francatrippe: created in the late 16th century, spoke a mixture of Bolognese and Tuscan dialects. An upper-class Brighella. Could be capable of gymnastic or other physical feats.   
Turlupin or Tirelupin: A French Brighella created by Henri Legrand. The name means, according to Duchartre, "unlucky". However, the Oxford English Dictionary mentions an etymology relating to a cult that modelled themselves on the Cynics and lived off of lupins that they gathered (tiraient). The character was reputedly fond of vulgar wordplay.   
Gandolin: A French Brighella, very fond of wordplay and puns. Sometimes wears a fur-lined plumed hat.   
Fritellino or Fristelin: see Francatrippa.  
Sgnarelle: A chronic drunk. 
Bagatino   
Gradelino   
Pasquariel   
Buffet   
Gian Fritello   
Narcisino   
Grattelard     
Mascarille   
La Montagne   
Frontin   
Labranche   
Figaro: as created by Beaumarchais. See Le Barbier de Séville.

References

Sources

My drama teacher (2017)

External links 
 A description of Brighella
 Carnival of Venice's page on Brighella
 Sipario Cyclopedia's entry on Brighella (in Italian and English)

Fictional characters introduced in the 16th century
Clever Zanni class characters
Fictional Italian people